Arbër Hebeja (born 27 March 2002) is an Albanian professional footballer who plays as a defender for Apolonia Fier.

Career statistics

Club

Notes

References

2002 births
Living people
Sportspeople from Fier
Albanian footballers
Association football defenders
Kategoria e Parë players
KF Apolonia Fier players